Kalyal Bhainsi is a village in Mirpur District of Azad Kashmir, Pakistan.

Demography 

According to the 1998 census of Pakistan, its population was 4,528.

References 

Populated places in Mirpur District